Snag Island is a small island in Suisun Bay, California. It is part of Solano County.

References

Islands of the San Francisco Bay Area
Islands of Northern California
Islands of Solano County, California
Islands of Suisun Bay